"(I Believe) Love's a Prima Donna" is a song by the British rock band Steve Harley & Cockney Rebel, which was released in 1976 as the second single from their fifth studio album Love's a Prima Donna. It was written and produced by Harley. The song reached No. 41 in the UK and would be the band's last charting single before their split in 1977.

Background
Following the UK Top 10 success of the lead single "Here Comes the Sun" during Summer 1976, "(I Believe) Love's a Prima Donna" was chosen as the second single from Love's a Prima Donna. Released in October, it peaked at No. 41 on the UK Singles Chart, remaining in the Top 50 for four weeks. The song had originally debuted at No. 48 in early November. Like the entire Love's a Prima Donna album, the song was recorded at Abbey Road Studios during sessions between June–September 1976.

Release
"(I Believe) Love's a Prima Donna" was released by EMI Records on 7" vinyl in the UK, the Netherlands, Germany, Belgium and Japan. The B-Side, "Sidetrack 1", was written and produced by Harley. It has remained exclusive to the single ever since. In the UK, two almost-identical editions of the single were released. One titled the B-Side as "Sidetrack 1", while the other "Sidetrack 1 (Group Version)". The follow-up "Sidetrack 2" appeared as an album track on Love's a Prima Donna.

The UK release had no artwork and was issued in a generic sleeve, however the other releases of the single featured picture sleeves. The Netherlands sleeve featured a photograph of the entire band, using black and light red as the only colours. The German release featured a close-up shot of Harley in front of a microphone on stage, while the Belgian release had no photograph, using the band's name and song title as large text with a blue background instead. The Japanese release featured the same artwork as the Love's a Prima Donna album. All sleeves of the single named the song as "Love is a Prima Donna", although the actual vinyl used the song's full title.

Following its original release as a single and on Love's a Prima Donna, the song has since appeared on the 1987 Steve Harley & Cockney Rebel compilation Greatest Hits, and the 2006 compilation The Cockney Rebel – A Steve Harley Anthology.

Promotion
No music video was filmed to promote the single. On 21 October 1976, the band appeared on the UK music show Top of the Pops to perform the song. Harley also performed the song, minus the band, on ITV's Supersonic show during the same period.

The song has been performed during the band's live concerts on many occasions. A version was included on the band's 1977 live album Face to Face. In 1989, the band's concert at Brighton, which included the song, was released on the VHS The Come Back, All is Forgiven Tour: Live.

Critical reception
On its release as a single, Sue Byrom of Record Mirror described the song as one with "a lot of changes of rhythm and tempo" and a "quick burst of Queen-type backing". She felt the song was "fairly complex" which "might put its chances at risk".

In a 1976 issue of the EMI Records Weekly News magazine Music Talk, Rex Anderson reviewed the Love's a Prima Donna album. He compared the track "(Love) Compared with You" with the title track: ""(I Believe) Love's a Prima Donna" is a brilliant contrast. The guy has been through all the different pangs of adolescent love and comes to the realisation that "love" is a prima donna." Later in the review, Anderson also noted: "Tony Rivers deserves some praise for his vocal arrangements, particularly on "(Love) Compared with You" and "Love's a Prima Donna"." In a review of the album, American magazine Billboard picked the song, along with "(Love) Compared with You", as the album's best cuts.

In a retrospective review, Donald A. Guarisco of AllMusic commented that the song was one of "Harley's finest songs". He described it as "a bracing song that features the writer waxing comical about the pitfalls of love over a briskly paced pop tune that fleshes out its pub-piano melody with flamenco guitar and a choir".

Track listing
7" single
"(I Believe) Love's a Prima Donna" - 4:11
"Sidetrack 1 (Group Version)" - 2:46

7" single (alternative release)
"(I Believe) Love's a Prima Donna" - 4:11
"Sidetrack 1" - 2:46

Chart performance

Personnel
Steve Harley & Cockney Rebel
 Steve Harley - vocals, guitar, producer
 Jim Cregan - guitar, backing vocals
 Duncan Mackay - keyboards
 George Ford - bass, backing vocals
 Stuart Elliott - drums

Additional personnel
 Lindsay Elliott - percussion
 Tony Rivers - backing vocals, backing vocal arrangement
 John G. Perry, Stuart Calver - backing vocals
 Tony Clark - sound engineer
 Pat Stapley - assistant sound engineer
 Ken Perry - mastering

References

1976 singles
EMI Records singles
Songs written by Steve Harley
1976 songs